Ampatuyoc (possibly from in the Quechua spelling Hamp'atuyuq; hamp'atu frog, -yuq a suffix, "the one with a frog (or frogs)") is a mountain in the Andes of Peru which reaches a height of approximately . It is located in the Huancavelica Region, Churcampa Province, Churcampa District. A lake named Chinchiqucha lies at its feet.

References

Mountains of Peru
Mountains of Huancavelica Region